Kosovo–Maldives relations refer to bilateral relations between Kosovo and the Maldives. Kosovo declared its independence from Serbia on 17 February 2008 and the Maldives recognised it on 19 February 2009. On the 16 April 2009, Kosovo and the Maldives established diplomatic relations with one another.

Bribery Accusations
On 7 March, the Maldivian President Mohamed Nasheed asked police to investigate the allegations of a US$2 million bribe given to Maldivian government officials to recognise Kosovo as an independent state. On 17 March, People's Majlis National Security Committee launched probe into Islamic Democratic Party's allegations regarding the bribery. Balkan Insight reported that Kosovo businessman, Behgjet Pacolli, who also heads the New Kosovo Alliance party, has denied any involvement in the bribery case and stated that he only lobbied for the recognition of Kosovo. Foreign Minister Ahmed Shaheed was cross-examined by the parliamentary committee on 28 March. The police investigation was closed on 6 May 2009, concluding that there was no evidence of corruption and the diplomatic process was conducted according to international standards; the NSC investigation was suspended.

Maldivian support at the ICJ

The Maldives was absent at the 8 October 2008 United Nations General Assembly vote regarding an ICJ hearing on the legality of Kosovo's independence. On 21 April 2009, it was announced by the ICJ that the Maldives was one of the 36 UN member states to summit a written statement to the ICJ regarding the legality of Kosovo's unilaterally proclaimed independence. The Maldives written statement is in favour and supports the legality of Kosovo's independence from Serbia.

The ICJ ruled that Kosovo's declaration of independence was legal.

See also
Foreign relations of Kosovo
Foreign relations of the Maldives

Notes and references
Notes:

References:

Maldives
Bilateral relations of the Maldives